CP24 is a Canadian English-language specialty news channel owned by Bell Media, a subsidiary of BCE Inc. and operated alongside the Bell-owned CTV Television Network's owned-and-operated television stations CFTO-DT (CTV Toronto) and CKVR-DT (CTV 2 Barrie). The channel broadcasts from 299 Queen Street West in Downtown Toronto.

It was first originally launched on March 30, 1998, under the name CablePulse24 by its owners CHUM Limited and Sun Media. The channel was named as an extension of CITY-TV (Citytv Toronto)'s newscasts, which were then known as CityPulse. CHUM acquired Sun Media's interest in 2004 after acquiring the assets of Craig Media. In 2006, Bell Globemedia acquired CP24 and its parent CHUM Limited, but regulatory limits in media ownership forced CHUM to sell off the Citytv stations to avoid conflicts with CTV stations in the same markets. CTVglobemedia retained the ownership of CP24 and the small market A-Channel stations, but subsequently sold the Citytv stations including CITY-TV, to Rogers Media in mid-2007, which held a 20% stake until 2008.

The channel focuses on local news from the Greater Toronto Area and Southern Ontario, while also covering national and international news. It is distributed through cable in Southern Ontario and direct broadcast satellite nationally.

Ownership history

CHUM
The channel was licensed by the Canadian Radio-television and Telecommunications Commission (CRTC) in 1996 as Pulse 24, described as "a 24-hour-a-day specialty television service devoted to news and information, with a focus on southern Ontario local and regional news and information", and launched on March 30, 1998, as CablePulse 24, under the ownership of CHUM Limited, the parent company of CITY-TV and minority partner Sun Media, owner of the Toronto Sun daily newspaper. For the first 10 years after its inception, CP24's programming was anchored and featured reports from Citytv personalities, live CityPulse news broadcasts were immediately repeated on CP24 after their initial broadcast on CITY-TV (except for breaking news coverage), and special coverage was simulcast between the channel and the television station. Select programming from other CHUM stations would also be featured on the channel, including The NewMusic and Fashion Television; another program, 24Ontario, featured news stories from CHUM's NewNet stations elsewhere in the province.

Overnight broadcasts on CP24 featured vintage CityPulse news broadcasts from CITY-TV during the 1970s & 1980s branded as Rewind. The rebroadcasts were accompanied by a graphic on the top right corner of the screen that read "Rewind", supplemented with the original airdate below it.

On December 1, 2004, CHUM Limited acquired the remaining interest in CP24 (giving it 100% of its shares), when the Sun's owners sold their 29.9% share in CP24 after acquiring its independent broadcast station CKXT-TV, the same day that CHUM Limited took control of Craig Media and its assets also.

Under CHUM ownership, Mark Dailey of CITY provided continuity voice announcements on CP24.

CTV

On July 12, 2006, Bell Globemedia (the latter which became CTVglobemedia in 2007) announced a friendly bid to take over CHUM Limited for an estimated $1.7 billion. One year later on June 8, 2007, the CRTC approved the CTV takeover of CHUM. However, the CRTC made the deal conditional on CTV selling the Citytv stations. On June 12, 2007, Rogers announced that it had agreed to buy the Citytv stations (including Citytv Toronto) for $375 million. The deal was finalized later that year, with a stipulation that CTV maintain ownership of CHUM's 299 Queen Street West headquarters and studios. CTV chose to keep CP24, and the rest of CHUM assets (including the A-Channel stations) it had said it would sell.

As a result of the ownership changes, CP24 began to separate its operations from those of CITY-TV. This process began in 2008, with the introduction of new CP24-only personalities (which meant they were no longer seen anchoring/reporting on the CityNews side), new live eye trucks (also known as Breaking News Vehicles) which were outfitted with white and black design bearing the CP24 and red "Breaking News" decals, the establishment of a new studio and newsroom on the second floor of the 299 Queen Street West building in November of that year, and the removal of nearly all Citytv's news simulcasts from its schedule few weeks later on December 10 of that year, (excluding Breakfast Television), and replacing the 6 p.m. CityNews simulcast with CFTO's CTV News Toronto at Six.

On March 26, 2009, Breakfast Television was replaced with the launch of its own new morning show, CP24 Breakfast, which marked the completion of CP24's separation from Citytv. Also coinciding with the launch, included the rebranding of its oldies music radio station 1050 CHUM (another station which was acquired in the CTV/CHUM acquisition) to a news talk radio format which operated as an audio simulcast of CP24 called "CP24 Radio 1050". The move was intended to broaden the network's reach as a multi-platform news source, but did not prove successful; Toronto Sun columnist Ted Woloshyn in particular pointed out that the station was simply airing a straight simulcast of CP24 television content that was not properly formatted for radio.

Following the layoffs and cost-cutting measures that took place at the Citytv stations across Canada (including the cancellation of Citytv Toronto's CityNews at Five announced on January 19, 2010), CP24 immediately expanded its Live at 5 newscast (which had been airing for 15 minutes since its launch in 2008) to 30 minutes along with the launch of another half-hour newscast, Live at 5:30. As a result, CP24's late-afternoon talk shows, such as Animal House Calls and Hot Property, which had been seen weekdays at 5:15 p.m. were moved to a new 7:15 p.m. time slot on January 26, 2010.

Bell
On September 10, 2010, BCE (a minority shareholder in CTVglobemedia) announced that it planned to acquire 100% interest in CTVglobemedia for a total debt and equity transaction cost of $3.2 billion CAD. The deal which required CRTC approval, was approved on March 7, 2011 and closed on April 1 of that year, on which CTVglobemedia was rebranded Bell Media.

On March 19, 2011, CP24 introduced a weekend edition of CP24 Breakfast, hosted by Pooja Handa and Gurdeep Ahluwalia, George Lagogianes is the remote host and Nneka Elliott (who resigned on May 2, 2011, and was replaced by Jamie Gutfreund) delivers the weather forecasts. The show runs from 7:00–10:15 a.m., however. CP24 at Night's branding was not changed.

CP24 and Much are the two remaining surviving CHUM-branded channels that maintained its name, since a number of former CHUM-owned sister networks were either rebranded, sold or ceased operations.

Location and format

CP24 is based at 299 Queen Street West, at the corner of John Street and Queen Street West. It used to share the newsroom with CITY-TV on the ground floor (which are now the facilities of Bell Media's 24-hour business news channel, BNN Bloomberg). In November 2008, CP24 moved its operations to a new studio and newsroom on the second floor of the complex. Coinciding with the new studio, CP24 also adopted an updated on-air appearance, replacing the previous blue and gold colour scheme with a red, white and black design.

CP24's screen format uses a window in the top-left of the screen to show the current program, which is surrounded with a sidebar with weather and traffic reports, scrolling news headlines and local entertainment/event information, and tickers for stocks and sports. This format has been described as more closely resembling a website than a conventional television channel, and has been replicated with a similar look of CP24's enriched screen on its website. This format was referred to as "NewStyle NewsFlow" during the CHUM era.

On September 27, 2012, CP24 again updated its on-air appearance as the channel began broadcasting in high definition. The relaunched enriched screen includes several changes such as:
 the entertainment and concert listings were reallocated from the bottom screen to the right-hand corner between the weather and traffic boxes,
 the weather scroll was expanded to a "five-day" contrast (which previously only displayed in "four-day" contrast) on which the scroll displays the forecast breakdown for the next 24-hours (e.g., "MORN" for both the current morning and the next morning, "AFT", for afternoon, "EVE" for evening and "NITE" for overnight), and
 a larger sports headline news scroll was added at the bottom, in which business news from Canada's Toronto Stock Exchange and the American New York Stock Exchange takes over the sports headline scroll Monday-Friday.

Programming

 Animal House Calls
 Breakfast Television
 CityNews at Noon
 CityNews at 6
 CityNews International
 CityNews Tonight
 CP24 Breakfast
 CP24 at Noon
 CP24 Tonight
 Help TV
 Hot Property
 Live at 5
 Live at 5:30
 MediaTelevision
 Silverman Helps
 The Chief
 The Mayor

Other affiliations
CP24 shares news resources with other Bell Media-owned outlets, including the news/talk radio affiliate CFRB "Newstalk 1010", sports updates with TSN (and CHUM "TSN Radio 1050"), business news updates with BNN Bloomberg and entertainment news updates with eTalk. From its inception prior to its acquisition by CTV, CP24 was closely integrated with CITY-DT's newsroom, which had shared programming, anchors and hosts at the time. CP24, is now available on iHeartRadio Canada effective December 2017.

Carriage and popularity
CP24 is seen on cable channel 24 on most cable providers that carry the channel. It is not carried on any analogue cable system outside of Central or Southern Ontario, although it is available on direct broadcast satellite and IPTV television providers in some markets. The channel is available across Canada on Bell Satellite TV, on which the station is part of the service's "News" package. It is also available in the "FYI" package provided to Shaw Direct customers.

Because of its diverse, localized and partially text-based content, the channel is among the most popular choices in the Greater Toronto Area and much of Southern Ontario (outside of Ottawa) for screening in public places such as waiting areas, train stations, restaurants, and lounges.

Remote camera use
In addition to the Freeway Management System – COMPASS and RESCU cameras, CP24 operates EYES cameras located at:
 CN Tower
 Highway 401
 Toronto Pearson International Airport
 Rogers Centre
 Toronto City Hall
 Don Valley Parkway
 299 Queen Street West

Chopper 24
Since 2008, CP24 has leased a Bell 206L-4 Long Ranger (C-FCTV) news helicopter which can broadcast live at 1500 feet above land; nicknamed Chopper 24, which is supplied by its sister station, CTV Toronto and is painted with CTV's colouring and logo.

Remote truck use
CP24 operates a fleet of remote transmission trucks that use digital microwave and satellite uplink systems to do live news reports throughout the region. Known as "Breaking News Vehicles" the custom-built 2008 Chevrolet Suburbans were outfitted by Frontline Communications of Clearwater, Florida, USA. The vehicles use a red, white and black paint scheme with the channel's logo and the "Breaking News!" slogan also included in the design.

Beat the Traffic
In 2009, CP24 became the first station in Canada to introduce a new Beat the Traffic system showing a three-dimensional animated map displaying traffic flow, roadwork, accidents and current highway travel times.

CP24 HD
The CRTC approved an application by then-owners CHUM Limited in June 2007 to launch a high-definition simulcast of CP24. On September 27, 2012, CP24 began broadcasting in HD (with the SD feed letterboxed) initially on Bell Fibe TV coinciding with it, a new enhanced on-air appearance. The HD feed was also added on the Bell Satellite TV service in December 2012. On June 25, 2013, CP24 began broadcasting in HD on Rogers Cable, shortly after the competing Rogers Media-owned CityNews Channel, which had been available in HD on Rogers Cable since launch, announced it would be shutting down. On March 1, 2017, Shaw Direct added the HD version to its lineup, it was only available in SD until then on that provider. Bell MTS has not yet launched the feed in HD.

CP24 GO
In December 2013, CP24 (along with several other Bell Media television channels) launched a TV Everywhere service known as CP24 GO, which is offered for free to Bell TV customers. It can be accessed from a computer or on a mobile app such as a tablet or smartphone. However, CP24 continues to offer its occasional free live streaming of some major news events on its website.

Notable on-air staff

Current
 Bill Coulter – weather specialist; also on CP24 Breakfast
 Jackie Crandles – news anchor/reporter; host of Live at 10, Live at 10:30 and Live at 11
 Nick Dixon – news anchor on CP24 Breakfast
 Jennifer Hsiung – news anchor on CP24 Breakfast
 George Lagogianes – weekday morning co–host of CP24 Breakfast; also reporter/anchor
 Jee-Yun Lee – news anchor/reporter; (former host of Live at 10, Live at 10:30 and Live at 11)
 Stephanie Smyth – breaking news reporter/co-host of Live at 5

Former

 Steve Anthony – weekday morning co–host of CP24 Breakfast. Now head of Media Relations and member of the Advisory Board at Direct Global / Direct Co-ops
 Thalia Assuras (later moved to ABC and then CBS). Now media and crisis management consultant
 Hugh Burrill – CityNews/CP24 sports anchor and AutoShop (later with The Fan 590 Sports Radio and retired from broadcasting since June 2021)
 Lance Chilton – reporter (now in Real Estate)
 Francis D'Souza – CityNews/CP24 anchor/reporter (now anchor for CityNews Toronto)
 Mark Dailey – CityNews/CP24 anchor/reporter and host of CityNews Tonight (died on December 6, 2010, after a long battle with kidney cancer)
 Denise Donlon (later CEO of Sony Music Canada and CBC Radio)
 Dwight Drummond – CityNews/CP24 crime reporter – former host of The Chief (joined CBC News Toronto on October 12, 2010)
 Mary Garofalo (later at WNYW in New York City; formerly host of Global's 16x9)
 Melissa Grelo – former co–host of CP24 Breakfast and anchor/reporter with CityNews/CP24 (now co–host of CTV's The Social exclusively)
 Larysa Harapyn – CityNews/CP24 entertainment reporter. Now reporter with Financial Post
 Lorne Honickman – CP24 legal specialist and practicing lawyer
 Bob Hunter (founder of Greenpeace; later died of cancer)
 Patricia Jaggernauth – weather specialist & remote reporter; co-host of CP24 Weekend, Live at 5, Live at 5:30, Live at 10, Live at 10:30, Live at 11, and occasional host, weather specialist & LIVE EYE host of CP24 Breakfast & CP24 Breakfast Weekend
 Stephen LeDrew – weekdays on CP24 Live at Noon. Fired from CP24 in 2017.
 Avi Lewis (later with CBC; now with Al Jazeera English)
 Gord Martineau – CityNews/CP24 anchor/reporter, CityNews at Six anchor for CP24, and anchor of CityNews International (now with CITY–TV's CityNews Toronto). Now retired.
 Jim McKenny – CityNews/CP24 sports anchor (now retired)
 Tracy Moore – reporter (now host of Citytv's CityLine)
 Anne Mroczkowski – CityNews/CP24 anchor/reporter – CityNews at Six anchor and host of The Mayor. Now media consultant and occasional actor
 Cynthia Mulligan – CityNews/CP24 anchor/reporter (now with CITY–TV's CityNews Toronto)
 David Onley – CP24 anchor and host of Homepage (served as Lieutenant Governor of Ontario 2007–2014). Now senior lecturer at University of Toronto Scarborough
 Alex Pierson – CityNews/CP24 reporter (later with Global News in Toronto and Sun News Network. Now a radio host with Corus)
 John Roberts (credited as J.D. Roberts) – entertainment reporter and weekend anchor (later with CNN's American Morning; formerly Atlanta–based national correspondent for Fox News Channel, now White House correspondent for Fox News)
 Monita Rajpal – CityNews/CP24 anchor/reporter. Later anchor/reporter with CNN International
 Ann Rohmer –  formerly host of CP24 Breakfast, Animal House Calls, Hot Property and On The Quarter. Returned to CP24 and is mainly weekend anchor
 Tonya Rouse – fitness specialist and host of CP24's Perfect Fit. Left broadcasting and moved to Chicago area
 Omar Sachedina – CP24 anchor/reporter (now a correspondent for CTV News)
 John Saunders – sportscaster, later worked for ESPN / deceased
 Devon Soltendieck – Evening News anchor and Autoshop host. Later as reporter with eTalk
 Ali Velshi – CP24 anchor/business correspondent. Now co-anchor of Velshi & Ruhle on MSNBC
 Brandon Gonez – weather specialist/Reporter; Host of CP24 Breakfast Weekend (former weather specialist on Your Morning)

Notes

References

External links

 

24-hour television news channels in Canada
CTV News
Television channels and stations established in 1998
Analog cable television networks in Canada
English-language television stations in Canada
1998 establishments in Ontario